The Indian locomotive class WAG-6A is a class of 25 kV AC electric locomotives that was developed in the 1988 by Allmänna Svenska Elektriska Aktiebolaget (ASEA)  for Indian Railways. The model name stands for broad gauge (W), AC Current (A), Goods (G) engine, 6th generation (6) First variant (A). They entered service in 1988. A total of 6 WAG-6A were built at ASEA, Sweden between 1987 and 1988. they were the most powerful locomotives in India until the arrival of the WAG-9 class.

These locomotives are now withdrawn from service with 1 unit earmarked for preservation.

History 

The history of WAG-6A begins in early 1980s with the aim of addressing the shortcomings of the previous WAG-1, WAG-2, WAG-3, WAG-4 and WAG-5 classes and remove steam locomotives from IR by a target date of 1990. The WAG-5 were a great successes but these locomotives were based on 1960s technology and fast became underpowered for the expanding Indian railways. So Indian Railways decided to look for a new locomotive. At that time (1980s) Thyristor controller was vastly used by locomotive in many European rail networks while 3 Phase AC technology was still in its infancy. So the ministry of railways floated a tender for a 6000HP locomotive with Thyristor control. The following responses were received:

 ASEA submitted their model with 6000 hp with Bo-Bo-Bo bogies and Thyristor chopper control.
 Hitachi submitted their model with 6000 hp with Bo-Bo-Bo bogies and Thyristor chopper control
 Hitachi also submitted their model with 6000 hp with Co-Co- bogies and Thyristor chopper control

Each company submitted their prototypes and Indian Railways designated these prototypes as the WAG-6A class WAG-6B class and WAG-6C class respectively. IR ordered 6 of each class and these were delivered in 1988.

Specification 
Manufacturer: ASEA ( WAG 6A )
Build dates: 1988–89
Wheel arrangement: Bo-Bo-Bo
Traction Motors: ASEA make (WAG-6A), L3 M 450–2. Six motors, fully suspended, force-ventilated, separately excited, 3100 kg.
Transformer: (WAG-6A) ASEA: TMZ 21, 7533 kVA.
Thyristor controller: (WAG-6A) 24 YST 45-26P24C thyristors each with 24 YSD35-OIP26 diodes, 2 x 511 V, 2 x 4500 A. 
Pantographs: (WAG-6A) Two Stemman BS 95.

Locomotive shed

See also 
Indian Railways
Rail transport in India#History
Locomotives of India
Rail transport in India

References

External links 

Specifications
India railway fan club
IR WAG-6 @ Trainspo
IT Locomotive Numbers

5 ft 6 in gauge locomotives
25 kV AC locomotives
Bo-Bo-Bo locomotives
Electric locomotives of India
Railway locomotives introduced in 1988
ASEA locomotives